Janina Skirlińska (8 March 1907 – 23 April 1993) was a Polish artistic gymnast. She competed at the 1936 Summer Olympics.  She was a member of the Polish women's team at those Olympics, where they placed 6th in the team competition.  Previously, she competed at the 1934 World Artistic Gymnastics Championships where she was the 3rd-place finisher.  Additionally, at the second-ever World Championships for women in 1938, in the all-around individual standings, she was the 4th-place finisher, the highest-finishing non-Czechoslovakian female competitor at those championships in Prague, Czechoslovakia.

References

1907 births
1993 deaths
Polish female artistic gymnasts
Gymnasts at the 1936 Summer Olympics
Olympic gymnasts of Poland
Medalists at the World Artistic Gymnastics Championships
People from Przeworsk County
Sportspeople from Podkarpackie Voivodeship